Fred Mahele Kuhaulua (born February 23, 1953) was a retired Major League Baseball pitcher. On August 1,  the left-hander was signed by the California Angels as an amateur free agent. He played for the Angels and the San Diego Padres.

Kuhaulua made his major league debut in relief on August 2, 1977 against the New York Yankees at Anaheim Stadium.  He pitched 2.1 innings and gave up five hits (including a Chris Chambliss home run) and three earned runs. Kuhaulua struck out Willie Randolph to end the 6th.  He appeared in three games for the Angels that month and had an ERA of 15.63, earning himself a trip back to the Salt Lake City Gulls of the Pacific Coast League.

After a season in Japan he was signed by the Padres on March 1, .

He pitched in five games for San Diego in 1981, including four starts, and had an ERA of 2.45.  His finest major league effort was in the last game of his career, on October 1, 1981 against Fernando Valenzuela and the Los Angeles Dodgers. Kuhaulua pitched the first eight innings of a 1-0 shutout that night at Dodger Stadium, and Eric Show saved it for him with a scoreless 9th.

Career totals for 8 games pitched include a 1-0 record, 5 games started, and 2 games finished.  He allowed 19 earned runs in 35.2 innings pitched, giving him a lifetime ERA of 4.79.

References
1980 Baseball Register published by The Sporting News

External links

1953 births
Living people
Major League Baseball pitchers
Baseball players from Hawaii
California Angels players
San Diego Padres players
Fresno Giants players
Great Falls Giants players
Salinas Packers players
Decatur Commodores players
El Paso Diablos players
Salinas Angels players
Hawaii Islanders players
Salt Lake City Gulls players
American expatriate baseball players in Japan
Chunichi Dragons players
Native Hawaiian sportspeople